Gerda Stevenson (born 10 April 1956 in Peeblesshire, Scotland) is a Scottish actress, director and writer, described by The Scotsman in 1999 as "Scotland's finest actress". She has played many parts in the theatre, including the title role in Edwin Morgan's English translation of Racine's Phèdre, and Lady Macbeth, and has appeared in many television dramas. She was Murron MacClannough's mother in the Mel Gibson film Braveheart, and her voice is familiar to listeners of British radio, as a reader of short stories and adaptations. In particular, she has performed several poems and songs by Robert Burns for the BBC.

Her play Federer Versus Murray toured to New York in 2012, and her poetry collection If This Were Real was published by Smokestack Books in 2013. In 2019, her poems illustrated the paintings of her one time neighbour, Scottish painter Christian Small, in the book Inside & Out - The Art of Christian Small, published by Scotland Street Press. 

She has adapted a number of works for radio: Self-Control by Mary Brunton in which Stevenson played the part of Laura Montreville; For the Love of Willie by Agnes Owens in which Stevenson played the part of Liza; The Heart of Midlothian by Sir Walter Scott for BBC Radio 4, nominated for a Sony Award in 2008, in which Stevenson played the part of the heroine Jeanie Deans; and Sunset Song by Lewis Grassic Gibbon. She has written radio plays including: Island Blue, Secrets: The Punter's Tale, Secrets: The Escort's Tale and The Apple Tree. She directed the Afternoon Play The Price of a Fish Supper.

Stevenson's partner was the late Scottish Gaelic poet Aonghas MacNeacail.

Her father was the musician and composer Ronald Stevenson. Her sister Savourna Stevenson (born 1961) has recorded works on the Scottish harp, the clàrsach. She is a graduate of RADA.

Radio

References

External links

Gerda Stevenson's website
Gerda Stevenson Radio appearances
Gerda Stevenson – her agent's profile

BBC Radio drama directors
Living people
Scottish film actresses
Scottish radio actresses
Scottish television actresses
Scottish writers
1959 births
Scottish women writers